Haiphong Maritime High School (Trung học phổ thông Hàng Hải), abbreviated as HMHS, is located at 338 Lach Tray St., Ngo Quyen District, Haiphong, Vietnam.

It was founded on July 21, 1989 under the management of Vietnam Maritime University. Almost students in the school are people whose in love with activities involved the seas and oceans in learning area as well as travelling.

Haiphong Maritime High School is the international name of the school which was set up by an alumnus Tran Bao Son (school year 2003-2006). This school also is the only high school in Vietnam called Hàng Hải.

High schools in Vietnam